tooXclusive is a Nigerian music and review website. Launched in 2010 by Olutayo "Tyler" Duncan Sotubo. This website is notable for organizing its yearly tooXclusive Online Music Awards. They pride their establishment as the number one source for pan-African music entertainment, reviews, trending news and celebrity updates.

Overview
tooXclusive was launched in 2010 by editor-in-chief Olutayo "Tyler" Duncan Sotubo. They provide a complete package of music/video downloads, reviews, industry news, top 10 charts, interviews and other music related editorials.

tooXclusive in their over six-year stint have become known for stylized top 10 charts, music video downloads and editorial content. The top 10 chart is a countdown of Naija's finest in the music industry spanning different categories including Producers, Next Rated Acts, Hottest Artistes, and Banging Collaborations. The chart is put together by the TX team after much research and deliberation. Each chart features 10 Nigerian music acts that have excelled in specific categories and met certain criteria within a given time frame.

tooXclusive also publishes editorial content at including spotlight profiles of artistes, their materials (music and videos), and critical music reviews.

tooXclusive has sometimes been controversial for having shared a writer's opinion in perspective on how these artistes enact their music propaganda.

tooXclusive Ghana
tooXclusive Ghana (or tooXclusive GH) is a branch of tooXclusive.com website which caters specifically for the needs of the fast growing Ghanaian music industry. The site features a comprehensive profile of Ghana's musical acts, songs, music videos and other entertainment related content.

Duncan Sotubo, CEO of tooXclusive, said, "The aim of tooxclusive from its inception has always been to be the biggest music distribution platform all over Africa and after a successful 4 years in Nigeria, we're convinced that we can comfortably branch out, offering the best of Ghanaian music to music lovers all over Africa."

tooXclusive Music Awards
The #TxOMA is first of its kind as far as online awards are concerned. It recognizes artistes and brands that have performed exceptionally well in a given year.

In a recent edition, Vanessa Mdee, Stonebwoy and Diamond Platnumz were recognized on this platform. Superstar acts like Vector, Yemi Alade, Seyi Shay, YCEE and Olamide received custom-designed award plaques. 

The tooXclusive Awards are held exclusively online, with votes being cast via the website.

Awards and nominations

See also
Naijatastic

References

External links
Official website

Music review websites
Internet properties established in 2010
Nigerian music websites
Online magazines published in Nigeria